Acanthoclita balanoptycha is a moth of the family Tortricidae first described by Edward Meyrick in 1910. It is found in the tropical areas of India, Sri Lanka, Malaysia and Micronesia.

Larval food plants are Butea monosperma, Millettia pinnata, Derris elliptica, Derris malaccensis, Millettia auriculata and Ehretia species.

References

Moths of Asia
Moths described in 1910
Olethreutinae